Maine College of Art & Design (MECA&D) is a private art school in Portland, Maine. Founded in 1882, Maine College of Art & Design is the oldest arts educational institution in Maine. Roughly 32% of MECA&D students are from Maine. The college is accredited by the New England Commission of Higher Education.

Campus 

Maine College of Art & Design’s only academic building resides on Congress Street. This building, the Porteous Building, was renovated in the late 1990s to suit the school’s needs. With  of space, this former department store is now a six-floor vertical campus.

Organization and administration 
MECA&D is a member of the Association of Independent Colleges of Art and Design (AICAD), a consortium of thirty-six art schools in the United States.

Academics 
MECA&D offers Bachelor of Fine Arts (BFA), Master of Fine Arts in Studio Art (MFA), and Master of Arts in Teaching (MAT) degrees. MECA&D acquired the Salt Institute for Documentary Studies in 2016. It offers the a Graduate Certificate in Documentary Studies and continuing studies programs.

References

External links

External links

Maine College of Art
Education in Portland, Maine
Educational institutions established in 1882
Universities and colleges in Cumberland County, Maine
1882 establishments in Maine
Art schools in Maine
Private universities and colleges in Maine